Oberwesel station is on the West Rhine Railway between Koblenz and Mainz in the UNESCO World Heritage Site of the Upper Middle Rhine Valley in the German state of Rhineland-Palatinate. The station is classified by Deutsche Bahn as a category 5 station. It is in the southern part of the town of Oberwesel and is served by Regional-Express services operated by Deutsche Bahn and Regionalbahn trains operated by trans regio Deutsche Regionalbahn.

History 
Oberwesel station was opened with the extension of the West Rhine Railway from Koblenz to Bingen at the end of 1859. In 1896, a track was built to the port. In 1907/08, the station building was extended by additions on its sides: an office for the station master, a station restaurant, and a 3rd class waiting room were added. In 1925–1927, the lobby was renovated and a separate toilet block was constructed on Mainzer Straße. In 1956, a pedestrian underpass was built under the tracks and in 1969/70 a building housing a relay interlocking was built next to the entrance building. In 2004, in the course of the construction of a park and ride facility, the toilet block was torn down.

Infrastructure
The station building at Oberwesel currently only accommodates residences and the interlocking. Tickets can be purchased at two ticket machines in the station entrance. The ticket office at the bus station acts as an agent of Deutsche Bahn and also sells rail tickets.

The station has three platform tracks. The “home” platform (platform 1) is connected by a pedestrian underpass to the central platform (tracks 2 and 3). In general, trains towards Mainz stop at platform 1 and trains towards Koblenz stop at track 2. Track 3 is used only by services that begin or end here or are overtaken (scheduled or unscheduled) here.

A new park and ride facility was built during the modernisation of the station. This includes approximately 100 parking spaces and parking for taxis, motor-scooters and bicycles. There are several bus bays for regional bus services.

Rail services
Oberwesel station is served by the following regional services:

Additional excursion trains run on Sundays and public holidays from May to October. These Regional-Express train pairs run from Koblenz to Wissembourg (the Weinstrassen-Express) and from Karlsruhe to Koblenz (the Rheintal-Express).

References

External links 
 

Railway stations in Rhineland-Palatinate
Railway stations in Germany opened in 1859